Choi Yong-jin (born 15 October 1922) was a South Korean speed skater. He competed in two events at the 1948 Winter Olympics.

References

External links
 

1922 births
Possibly living people
South Korean male speed skaters
Olympic speed skaters of South Korea
Speed skaters at the 1948 Winter Olympics
Place of birth missing (living people)